Bocaparvovirus is a genus of viruses in the subfamily Parvovirinae of the virus family Parvoviridae. Humans, cattle, and dogs serve as natural hosts. There are 28 species in this genus. Diseases associated with this genus include, in humans, acute respiratory illness, and in cattle, diarrhea and mild respiratory symptoms.

History
Bocaviruses were first described in animals in the early 1960s.

Genome
Like the other members of this family, bocaparvoviruses have two open reading frames—ORF1 and 2. Unique among parvoviruses, the bocaparvoviruses contain a third open reading frame between non-structural and structural coding regions. This gene encodes a highly phosphorylated nonstructural protein (NP1).

ORF1 encodes a nonstructural protein (NS1) that is involved in viral genome replication. ORF2 encodes the two capsid proteins—VP1 and VP2.

Like other parvoviruses, the VP1 unique region contains a phospholipase A(2) motif with a conserved Histidine–Aspartic acid-XXY motif in the catalytic center.

Taxonomy
The following 28 species are assigned to the genus:

Carnivore bocaparvovirus 1
Carnivore bocaparvovirus 2
Carnivore bocaparvovirus 3
Carnivore bocaparvovirus 4
Carnivore bocaparvovirus 5
Carnivore bocaparvovirus 6
Chiropteran bocaparvovirus 1
Chiropteran bocaparvovirus 2
Chiropteran bocaparvovirus 3
Chiropteran bocaparvovirus 4
Chiropteran bocaparvovirus 5
Lagomorph bocaparvovirus 1
Pinniped bocaparvovirus 1
Pinniped bocaparvovirus 2
Primate bocaparvovirus 1
Primate bocaparvovirus 2
Primate bocaparvovirus 3
Rodent bocaparvovirus 1
Rodent bocaparvovirus 2
Ungulate bocaparvovirus 1
Ungulate bocaparvovirus 2
Ungulate bocaparvovirus 3
Ungulate bocaparvovirus 4
Ungulate bocaparvovirus 5
Ungulate bocaparvovirus 6
Ungulate bocaparvovirus 7
Ungulate bocaparvovirus 8
Ungulate bocaparvovirus 9

Virus details
In Parvoviridae, species are now generally defined as a cluster of viruses that encode replication initiator proteins (called NS1) that have amino acid sequences that are at least 85% identical to those encoded by all other members of the species.

Marmots have also been identified as the hosts of novel bocaparvoviruses.

Virology
Bovine bocaviruses utilise endocytosis in clathrin-coated vesicles to enter cells; they are dependent upon acidification, and appear to be associated with actin and microtubule dependency.

All bocaparvoviruses encode a novel protein called NP1 that is not present in parvoviruses from other genera. In Canine minute virus NP1 has been shown to be essential for an early step in viral replication and is also required for the read through of an internal polyadenylation site that is essential for expression of the capsid proteins.

Life cycle
Viral replication is nuclear. Entry into the host cell is achieved by attachment to host receptors, which mediates clathrin-mediated endocytosis. Replication follows the rolling-hairpin model. DNA-templated transcription, with some alternative splicing mechanism is the method of transcription. The virus exits the host cell by nuclear pore export.
Humans, cattle, and dogs serve as the natural host. Transmission routes are oral and respiratory.

Clinical
These viruses generally infect the gastrointestinal and respiratory tracts. Some may cross the placenta and cause congenital infection of the fetus.

Canine minute virus, first isolated in 1967 and associated with disease in 1970, causes respiratory disease with breathing difficulty and enteritis with severe diarrhoea, spontaneous abortion of fetuses, and death of newborn puppies.

Human bocaviruses were first isolated in 2005 in Sweden. They may be able to cause hepatitis in an immunosuppressed host.

Bocaparvoviruses have been isolated from human colon and lung cancers. The clinical importance of this finding—if any—remains to be seen.

The incidence of bocavirus in patients with cancer is higher than that of healthy controls.

Structure
Like other parvoviruses, bocaparvoviruses have an icosahedral and round structure with T=1 symmetry. The capsid is non-enveloped, and composed of 60 copies of up to six types of capsid proteins (called VP1 through to VP6) which share a common C-terminal region. The structure of a virus-like particle composed only of VP2 protein was determined by cryogenic electron microscopy and image reconstruction. The diameter is around 21-22 nm. Genomes are linear, around 5.5kb in length

References

External links
 Viralzone: Bocaparvovirus
  ICTV 2018 Bocaparvovirus]

Parvovirinae
Virus genera